The Indian Government published a White Paper on Jammu and Kashmir in 1948 in an effort to explain the Indian position on the Kashmir dispute. It allegedly contains numerous references to the issue of holding free and impartial plebiscite in Kashmir under the auspices of the United Nations.

References

Further reading
 
 
 
Honor of Gurais: Grenadiers and 2/4 Gurkha led by Brigadier Rajendra Singh 1948. Capture of the Kashmir Valley and Control with Command.

External links
 Kashmir Website with Historical Timeline
 Kashmir's Forgotten Plebiscite

Kashmir
Books about the Kashmir conflict